Muzdurlar is a village and municipality in the Goranboy Rayon of Azerbaijan.  It has a population of 1,362. The municipality consists of the villages of Muzdurlar and Əhmədabad.

References 

Populated places in Goranboy District